This is a list of people who have served as Lord Lieutenant of the English county of Wiltshire. From 1750, all Lord Lieutenants have also been Custos Rotulorum of Wiltshire.

Lord Lieutenants of Wiltshire
William Herbert, 1st Earl of Pembroke 1551 – 17 March 1570
Henry Herbert, 2nd Earl of Pembroke 1570 – 15 January 1601
Edward Seymour, 1st Earl of Hertford 24 April 1601 – 6 April 1621
William Herbert, 3rd Earl of Pembroke 14 April 1621 – 10 April 1630
Philip Herbert, 4th Earl of Pembroke 12 August 1630 – 1642
Interregnum
William Seymour, 1st Marquess of Hertford 10 July 1660 – 24 October 1660
Thomas Wriothesley, 4th Earl of Southampton 21 February 1661 – 16 May 1667
Edward Hyde, 1st Earl of Clarendon 18 June 1667 – 2 April 1668
Arthur Capell, 1st Earl of Essex 2 April 1668 – 22 August 1672
John Seymour, 4th Duke of Somerset 22 August 1672 – 29 April 1675
Philip Herbert, 7th Earl of Pembroke 20 May 1675 – 29 August 1683
Thomas Herbert, 8th Earl of Pembroke 11 October 1683 – 22 January 1733 jointly with
William Paston, 2nd Earl of Yarmouth 22 March 1688 – 16 May 1689
Henry Herbert, 9th Earl of Pembroke 24 August 1733 – 9 January 1750
Hon. Robert Sawyer Herbert 20 March 1750 – 3 April 1756
Henry Herbert, 10th Earl of Pembroke 3 April 1756 – 22 March 1780
Thomas Brudenell-Bruce, 1st Earl of Ailesbury 22 March 1780 – 8 April 1782
Henry Herbert, 10th Earl of Pembroke 8 April 1782 – 26 January 1794
George Herbert, 11th Earl of Pembroke 21 March 1794 – 26 October 1827
Henry Petty-Fitzmaurice, 3rd Marquess of Lansdowne 23 November 1827 – 31 January 1863
George Brudenell-Bruce, 2nd Marquess of Ailesbury 25 March 1863 – 6 January 1878
Jacob Pleydell-Bouverie, 4th Earl of Radnor 18 March 1878 – 11 March 1889
John Thynne, 4th Marquess of Bath 1 April 1889 – 20 April 1896
Henry Petty-Fitzmaurice, 5th Marquess of Lansdowne 1 June 1896 – 3 March 1920
Walter Long, 1st Viscount Long 3 March 1920 – 26 September 1924
Jacob Pleydell-Bouverie, 6th Earl of Radnor 22 December 1924 – 26 June 1930
Sir Ernest Wills, 3rd Baronet 7 October 1930 – 4 May 1942
Evelyn Seymour, 17th Duke of Somerset 4 May 1942 – 26 April 1954
Sidney Herbert, 16th Earl of Pembroke 7 September 1954 – 16 March 1969
John Morrison, 1st Baron Margadale 26 August 1969 – 17 December 1981
Sir Hugh Trefusis Brassey 17 December 1981 – 15 December 1989
Field Marshal Sir Roland Gibbs 15 December 1989 – 5 July 1996
Lt-General Sir Maurice Johnston 5 July 1996 – 10 November 2004
John Barnard Bush 10 November 2004 – February 2012
Sarah Troughton February 2012 – present

Vice Lord Lieutenants of Wiltshire
Colonel Hugh Trefusis Brassey, 1969–1981
Field Marshal Sir Roland Gibbs, 1982–1990
Major-General John Myles (Robin) Brockbank, 1990–1996
John Richard Arundell, 10th Baron Talbot of Malahide, 2004–2006
Lieutenant Colonel James Rixon Arkell, 2006–2012
Charles Petty-FitzMaurice, 9th Marquess of Lansdowne, 2012–2016
Lieutenant-General Sir Roderick Alexander Cordy-Simpson, 2016–2019
William Francis Wyldbore-Smith, 2019–present

See also
List of deputy lieutenants of Wiltshire
High Sheriff of Wiltshire

References
 

 

Wiltshire
 
 
Wiltshire-related lists